The 1943 La Flèche Wallonne was the seventh edition of La Flèche Wallonne cycle race and was held on 23 May 1943. The race started in Mons and finished in Charleroi. The race was won by Marcel Kint.

General classification

References

1943 in road cycling
1943
1943 in Belgian sport